Dorothy Celeste Boulding Ferebee (October 10, 1898 – September 14, 1980) was an American obstetrician and civil rights activist.

Biography

Background and Early Life
Born on October 10, 1898, in Norfolk, Virginia, Dorothy Celeste Boulding Ferebee was a civil rights pioneer, a groundbreaking physician, and an AAUW board member who worked tirelessly in ensuring access to healthcare for underserved communities (AAUW, 2022). While she was young, her mother, Florence Boulding, became ill and sent her and her brother, Ruffin, to live with her great aunt in Boston, Massachusetts (Mack, 2021. Dorothy and her brother, Ruffin grew up in the middle-class neighborhood of Beacon Hill (National Institutes of Health, 2015).
Her family provided her with an enriched childhood, composed of eight attorneys. Although discussions about law dominated the household, Dorothy wanted to be a doctor her whole life. Since being a child, she always wanted to aid the injured and cure the sick. While most of the other girls her age were playing with toys, she was out doctoring ailing and injured animals (National Institutes of Health, 2015).

Education
After graduating from English High School in 1915 with the highest honors, Dorothy attended Simmons College in Boston. During her undergrad years she became a member of Alpha Kappa Alpha Sorority Incorporated, Epsilon Chapter. She immediately applied to medical school at Tufts University School of Medicine after graduating from Simmons College (National Institutes of Health, 2015). She finished in 1924 (Mack, 2021) among the top five in her class College (National Institutes of Health, 2015). In 1927, she was one of nine women to pass the District of Columbia medical exam (Brandman, 2021).

Career and Impact
Despite graduating from Tufts with an exceptional ranking amongst her class, Boulding was met with a barrier of racism and discrimination as she was not allowed to intern at white hospitals in the Boston area (National Institutes of Health, 2015). So, instead, she moved down to Washington D.C. and started her internship at the black-owned and staffed Freedmen’s Hospital. She worked at Freedmen’s Hospital as an obstetrician, where began promoting contraception and sex education to women, which were both highly controversial topics during the time (Brandman, 2021). Upon completing her internship in 1925, she began her own medical clinic in an impoverished part of the city (Mack, 2021). To improve healthcare in the neighborhood, she persuaded the trustees of the Friendship House, which were a charitable segregated medical center, to open an additional clinic for African Americans. This clinic was later named Southeast Neighborhood House. She further set up the Southeast Neighborhood Society, which contained a playground and daycare for the children of working mothers (National Institutes of Health, 2015). In the same year, she also joined the faculty of Howard University Medical School where she was appointed medical physician to women. The next year, she married a professor in Howard University College of Dentistry, named Claude Thurston Ferebee. Together, they had twins, one boy and one girl (Mack, 2021). In 1949, she was named medical director for Howard’s Health services, which is a post she held until her retirement in 1968 (Mack, 2021). 
Boulding continued to live in Washington D.C. and work at Howard University; however, she spent the summers of 1935 to 1942 as director of the Mississippi Health Project. This was a project sponsored by the Alpha Kappa Alpha sorority to provide healthcare to sharecropper families in Holmes and Mound Bayou Counties (Mack, 2021). She additionally became an active member of the civil rights movement as a member of the National Council of Negro Women (NCNW). In the fall of 1949, they elected her president of the organization (Mack, 2021). Here, she augmented the organization’s efforts to promote healthcare, and education, and continued its work to end discrimination against African Americans and women in the military, housing, employment, and voting. As president of NCNW, she issued her “Nine Point Program” which outlined a plan to achieve fundamental civil rights through educational and legislative initiatives. Through all of this, Boulding remained a full-time obstetrician (Brandman, 2021).
Dedication and commitment to advocating for healthcare and civil rights were reflected through Boulding’s extensive involvement as a member of many national and international organizations. She served on the boards of the White House’s Children and Youth Council, as well as the United Nations Children’s Fund (UNICEF). She was even selected by the U.S. State Department, as a delegate to the International Council of Women of the World in Greece (Brandman, 2021). The Department of Labor’s Women’s Bureau named her to a delegation that observed the impact of postwar conditions on women and children in Germany. In 1963, she traveled to Selma, Alabama as part of a campaign to register African Americans to vote. Here, she also spoke on behalf of women’s rights (Brandman, 2021). In 1967, Boulding was appointed as one of the five U.S. delegates to the World Health Organization’s twentieth assembly in Geneva, Switzerland as well as the D.C. Commission on the Status of Women, which she chaired from 1971 to 1974 (Brandman, 2021). 
Dorothy Celeste Boulding Ferebee succumbed to congestive heart failure and passed away on September 14, 1980, at Georgetown University Hospital in Washington D.C. (Mack, 2021).

References

References

Further reading

External links
Changing the Face of Medicine - National Library of Medicine
Black Past: Remembered and Reclaimed
Official Website of Alpha Kappa Alpha Sorority, Incorporated: Presidents
Presidents of Alpha Kappa Alpha Sorority

1898 births
1980 deaths
African-American physicians
20th-century American women physicians
20th-century American physicians
American gynecologists
American obstetricians
Howard University faculty
People from Norfolk, Virginia
Simmons University alumni
Tufts University School of Medicine alumni
African-American activists
Howard University College of Medicine alumni
African-American women physicians
20th-century African-American women
American women academics
Alpha Kappa Alpha presidents